Eckels is a surname. Notable people with the name include:

Frank Eckels Beltzhoover (1841–1923) American lawyer and Members of the United States House of Representatives  from Pennsylvania
James H. Eckels (1858–1907), United States Comptroller of the Currency
Kelley Eckels Currie, American lawyer and government official

See also
Eckel (disambiguation)